Renewable energy in the United Kingdom contributes to production for electricity, heat, and transport.

From the mid-1990s, renewable energy began to play a part in the UK's electricity generation, building on a small hydroelectric capacity. Wind power, which is abundant in the UK, has since become the main source of renewable energy. , renewable sources generated 40.2% of the electricity produced in the UK; around 6% of total UK energy usage.

Interest has increased in recent years due to UK and EU targets for reductions in carbon emissions, and government incentives for renewable electricity such as the Renewable Obligation Certificate scheme (ROCs) and feed in tariffs (FITs), as well as for renewable heat such as the Renewable Heat Incentive.  The 2009 EU Renewable Directive established a target of 15% reduction in total energy consumption in the UK by 2020.

History 
Heat from wood fires goes back to the earliest human habitation of Britain.

Waterwheel technology was imported by the Romans, with sites in Ikenham and Willowford in England being from the 2nd century AD. At the time of the Domesday Book (1086), there were 5,624 watermills in England alone, almost all of them located by modern archaeological surveys, which suggest a higher of 6,082, with many others likely unrecorded in the northern reaches of England. By 1300, this number had risen to between 10,000 and 15,000.

Windmills first appeared in Europe during the Middle Ages. The earliest reliable reference to a windmill in Europe (assumed to have been of the vertical type) dates from 1185, in the former village of Weedley in Yorkshire, at the southern tip of the Wold overlooking the Humber Estuary. The first electricity-generating wind turbine was a battery charging machine installed in July 1887 by Scottish academic James Blyth to light his holiday home in Marykirk, Scotland.

In 1878, the world's first hydroelectric power scheme was developed at Cragside in Northumberland, England by William George Armstrong. It was used to power a single arc lamp in his art gallery.

However, almost all electricity generation thereafter was based on burning coal. In 1964, coal accounted for 88% of electricity, and oil for 11%. The remainder was mostly hydroelectric power, which continued to grow its share as coal struggled to meet demand. The world's third pumped-storage hydroelectric power station, the Cruachan Dam in Argyll and Bute, Scotland, came on line in 1967. The Central Electricity Generating Board attempted to experiment with wind energy on the Llŷn Peninsula in Wales during the 1950s, but this was shelved after local opposition.

Modern era

Renewable energy experienced a turning point in the 1970s, with the 1973 oil crisis, the 1972 miners' strike, growing environmentalism, and wind energy development in the United States exerting pressure on the government. In 1974, the Central Policy Review Staff recommended that ‘the first stage of a full technical and economic appraisal of harnessing wave power for electricity generation should be put in hand at once.’ Wave power was seen to be the future of the nation's energy policy, and solar, wind, and tidal schemes were dismissed as 'impractical'. Nevertheless, an alternative energy research centre was opened in Harwell, although it was criticised for favouring nuclear power. By 1978, four wave energy generator prototypes had been designed which were later deemed too expensive. The Wave Energy Programme closed in the same year.

During this period, there was a large increase in installations of solar thermal collectors to heat water. In 1986, Southampton began pumping heat from a geothermal borehole through a district heating network. Over the years, several combined heat and power (CHP) engines and backup boilers for heating have been added, along with absorption chillers and backup vapour compression machines for cooling.

In 1987 a 3.7MW demonstration wind turbine on Orkney began supplying electricity to homes, the largest in Britain at the time. Privatisation of the energy sector in 1989 ended direct governmental research funding. Two years later the UK's first onshore windfarm was opened in Delabole, Cornwall: ten turbines producing enough energy for 2,700 homes. This was followed by the UK's first offshore windfarm in North Hoyle, Wales.

The share of renewables in the country's electricity generation has risen from below 2% in 1990 to 14.9% in 2013, helped by subsidy and falling costs. Introduced on 1 April 2002, the Renewables Obligation requires all electricity suppliers who supply electricity to end consumers to supply a set portion of their electricity from eligible renewables sources; a proportion that would increase each year until 2015 from a 3% requirement in 2002–2003, via 10.4% in 2010-2012 up to 15.4% by 2015–2016. The UK Government announced in the 2006 Energy Review an additional target of 20% by 2020–21. For each eligible megawatt hour of renewable energy generated, a tradable certificate called a Renewables obligation certificate (ROC) is issued by OFGEM.

In 2007, the United Kingdom Government agreed to an overall European Union target of generating 20% of the European Union's energy supply from renewable sources by 2020. Each European Union member state was given its own allocated target; for the United Kingdom it is 15%. This was formalised in January 2009 with the passage of the EU Renewables Directive. As renewable heat and fuel production in the United Kingdom are at extremely low bases, RenewableUK estimates that this will require 35–40% of the United Kingdom's electricity to be generated from renewable sources by that date, to be met largely by 33–35 GW of installed wind capacity. The 2008 Climate Change Act consists of a commitment to reducing net Greenhouse Gas Emissions by 80% by 2050 (on 1990 levels) and an intermediate target reduction of 26% by 2020.

The Green Deal is UK government policy, launched by the Department of Energy and Climate Change on 1 October 2012. It permits loans for energy saving measures for properties in Great Britain to enable consumers to benefit from energy efficient improvements to their home.

The total of all renewable electricity sources provided for 14.9% of the electricity generated in the United Kingdom in 2013, reaching 53.7 TWh of electricity generated. In the second quarter of 2015, renewable electricity generation exceeded 25% and coal generation for the first time.

In 2013, renewables totalled 5.2% of all energy produced in the UK, contributing toward the 15% reduction target by 2020 set by the 2009 EU Renewable Directive, as measured by the Directive's methodology. By 2015, this rose to 8.3%.

In June 2017, renewables plus nuclear generated more UK power than gas and coal together for the first time. Britain has the fourth greenest power generation in Europe and the seventh worldwide. In 2017 new offshore wind power became cheaper than new nuclear power for the first time. The UK is still heavily dependent on gas and vulnerable to fluctuations in world gas prices.

Government figures show that low-carbon energy was used to generate more than half of the electricity used in the UK for the first time in 2018. The proportion of electricity generated by renewables in the UK grew to 33% in 2018.

From 2020 a rapid expansion of grid scale battery storage has been underway, helping to cope with the variability in wind and solar power. , 1.3GW of grid storage batteries was active, along with the earlier pumped storage at Dinorwig, Cruachan and Ffestiniog.

Economics

For comparison, CCGT (combined cycle gas turbine) without carbon capture or carbon costs had an estimated cost in 2020 of 4.7pence/kWh (£47/MWh). Offshore wind prices dropped far faster than the forecasts predicted, and in 2017 two offshore wind farm bids were made at a cost of 5.75pence/kWh (£57.50/MWh) for construction by 2022–2023.

Strike prices 

The "strike price" forms the basis of the Contract for Difference between the 'generator and the Low Carbon Contracts Company (LCCC), a government-owned company' and guarantees the price per MWh paid to the electricity producer. It is not the same as the levelised cost of electricity (LCOE) which is a first order estimate of the average cost the producer must receive to break-even.

Low-carbon generation sources have agreed "strike prices" in the range £50-£79.23/MWh for photovoltaic, £80/MWh for energy from waste, £79.23-£82.5/MWh for onshore wind, and £114.39-£119.89/MWh for offshore wind and conversion technologies (all expressed in 2012 prices). These prices are indexed to inflation.

With new interconnectors, specifically the ongoing construction of the NSN Link is expected to finish in 2020 after which the UK will get 1.4GW of access to less expensive sources in the south Norway bidding area (NO2) of Nord Pool Spot.  Similarly, Viking Link is expected to start operations in 2022, after which the UK will get another 1.4GW of access to the less expensive west Denmark bidding area (DK1) of Nord Pool Spot.

Wind

Wind power delivers a growing fraction of the energy in the United Kingdom. By the beginning of February 2020, wind power production consisted of 10,429 wind turbines with a total installed capacity of over 22GW: 13,575MW of onshore capacity and 8,483MW of offshore capacity, having risen from  7,950MW onshore and 4,049MW offshore since 2015  The UK is ranked as the world's sixth largest producer of wind power, having overtaken France and Italy in 2012.

Polling of public opinion consistently shows strong support for wind power in the UK, with nearly three-quarters of the population agreeing with its use, even among those living near onshore wind turbines. Wind power is expected to continue growing in the UK for the foreseeable future. Within the UK, wind power is the second largest source of renewable energy after biomass. , Ørsted (formerly DONG Energy) is the UK's largest windfarm operator with stakes in planned or existing projects able to produce 5GW of wind energy.

2010 saw the completion of significant projects in the UK wind industry with the Gunfleet Sands, Robin Rigg and Thanet offshore wind farms coming on-stream.

Ocean power

Due to the island location of the UK, the country has great potential for generating electricity from wave power and tidal power.

To date, wave and tidal power have received very little money for development and consequently have not yet been exploited on a significant commercial basis due to doubts over their economic viability in the UK. The European Marine Energy Centre in Orkney operates a grid connected wave power scheme at Billia Croo outside Stromness and a grid connected tidal test site in a narrow channel between the Westray Firth and Stronsay Firth.

Funding for the UK's first wave farm was announced by then Scottish Executive in February 2007. It will be the world's largest, with a capacity of 3MW generated by four Pelamis machines and a cost of over £4million. In the south of Scotland, investigations have taken place into a tidal power scheme involving the construction of a Solway Barage, possibly located south of Annan.

A wave farm project to harness wave power, using the PB150 PowerBuoy has been completed by Ocean Power Technologies in Scotland and is under development off Cornwall at Wave Hub.

Biofuels

Gas from sewage and landfill (biogas) has already been exploited in some areas. In 2004, it provided 129.3GW·h (up 690% from 1990 levels), and was the UK's leading renewable energy source, representing 39.4% of all renewable energy produced (including hydro). The UK has committed to a target of 10.3% of renewable energy in transport to comply with the Renewable Energy Directive of the European Union but has not yet implemented legislation to meet this target.

Other biofuels can provide a close-to-carbon-neutral energy source, if locally grown. In South America and Asia, the production of biofuels for export has in some cases resulted in significant ecological damage, including the clearing of rainforest. In 2004, biofuels provided 105.9GW·h, 38% of it wood. This represented an increase of 500% from 1990.

Solar

At the end of 2011, there were 230,000 solar power projects in the United Kingdom, with a total installed generating capacity of 750MW. By February 2012 the installed capacity had reached 1,000 MW. 
Solar power use has increased very rapidly in recent years, albeit from a small base, as a result of reductions in the cost of photovoltaic (PV) panels, and the introduction of a Feed-in tariff (FIT) subsidy in April 2010. In 2012, the government said that 4million homes across the UK will be powered by the sun within eight years, representing a target of 22GW of installed solar power capacity by 2020. By February 2019, approx 13GW had been installed

Hydroelectric

As of 2012, hydroelectric power stations in the United Kingdom accounted for 1.67GW of installed electrical generating capacity, being 1.9% of the UK's total generating capacity and 14% of UK's renewable energy generating capacity. Annual electricity production from such schemes is approximately 5,700GWh, being about 1.5% of the UK's total electricity production.

There are also pumped-storage power stations in the UK. These power stations are net consumers of electrical energy however they contribute to balancing the grid, which can facilitate renewable generation elsewhere, for example by 'soaking up' surplus renewable output at off-peak times and release the energy when it is required.

Geothermal power

Investigations into the exploitation of Geothermal power in the United Kingdom, prompted by the 1973 oil crisis, were abandoned as fuel prices fell. Only one scheme is operational, in Southampton. In 2009, planning permission was granted for a geothermal scheme near Eastgate, County Durham, but funding was withdrawn and  there has been no further progress. In November 2018, drilling started for a plant planning permission for a commercial-scale geothermal power plant on the United Downs industrial estate near Redruth by Geothermal Engineering. The plant will produce 3MW of renewable electricity. In December 2010, the Eden Project in Cornwall was given permission to build a Hot Rock Geothermal Plant. Drilling was planned to start in 2011, but , funding is still being sought.

Microgeneration
Microgeneration technologies are seen as having considerable potential by the Government. However, the microgeneration strategy launched in March 2006 was seen as a disappointment by many commentators. Microgeneration involves the local production of electricity by homes and businesses from low-energy sources including small scale wind turbines, and solar electricity installations. The Climate Change and Sustainable Energy Act 2006 is expected to boost the number of microgeneration installations, however, funding for grants under the Low Carbon Building Programme is proving insufficient to meet demand with funds for March 2007 being spent in 75minutes.

Community energy systems
Sustainable community energy systems, pioneered by Woking Borough Council, provide an integrated approach to using cogeneration, renewables and other technologies to provide sustainable energy supplies to an urban community. It is expected that the same approach will be developed in other towns and cities, including London. Highlands and Islands Community Energy Company based in Inverness are active in developing community-owned and led initiatives in Scotland.

An energy positive house was built in Wales for £125,000 in July 2015. It is expected to generate £175 in electricity export for each £100 spent on electricity.

See also 

 Renewable energy in Scotland
 Renewable energy in Wales
 Renewable energy in the Republic of Ireland
Green electricity in the United Kingdom
 Energy in the United Kingdom
 List of renewable resources produced and traded by the United Kingdom
 Renewable energy by country
 Renewable energy in the European Union
Decarbonisation measures in proposed UK electricity market reform
 Department of Energy and Climate Change (DECC)

References

External links 
 Sustainable Energy at DEFRA
 The UK Renewable Energy Strategy (official government policy)
Planning Policy Statement 22 (PPS22) on renewable energy
 UK Renewables Policy.
 Small-scale Wind Power in the UK
 Britain's Old Industries See Renewable Boost
 Britain To Launch Innovative Feed-in Tariff Program in 2010
Map of UK renewable power installations
UK energy generation dashboard